Adeodato Turchi (5 August 1724 – 2 September 1803) was a Roman Catholic prelate who served as Bishop of Parma.

Biography
He was born Dominque Charles Marie Turchi to indigent parents in Parma, Italy on 5 August 1724. He studied under the Jesuits. By the age of 23 years, he was ordained a priest in the order of St Francis Capuchin on 24 September 1747.

He gained fame in Italy for his sermons, including one in 1764: Discorso sul segreto politico before the Senate of Lucca. He obtained an appointment in the court of Ferdinand I, Duke of Parma. However, in Parma he was involved in disputes with other preachers and with a cousin of the Pope Clement XIII, Carlo Gastone della Torre Rezzonico. This dispute may have cost him advancement to cardinal. His sermons were collected and published.  

On 21 September 1788, he was appointed during the papacy of Pope Pius VI as Bishop of Parma. He was consecrated bishop by Andrea Corsini, Cardinal-bishop of Santa Sabina. 
He served as Bishop of Parma until his resignation on 23 September 1735.
He died on 2 September 1803.

References 

18th-century Italian Roman Catholic bishops
Bishops appointed by Pope Pius VI
1724 births
1803 deaths